The soprano recorder in c2, also known as the descant, is the third-smallest instrument of the modern recorder family and is usually played as the highest voice in four-part ensembles (SATB = soprano, alto, tenor, bass). Since its finger spacing is relatively small, it is often used in music education for children first learning to play an instrument.

Voice
The soprano recorder is an octave above the level of the human soprano voice. Its lowest note is c2 (this article is notated using Helmholtz notation, in scientific pitch notation the same note is represented as C5), the normal range is c2–d4. Compositions for soprano recorder are usually notated an octave lower than they sound. Its timbre is similar to the sound of the flue pipes of an organ, which is why some organ stops sound similar to a recorder. These registers are called then block-flute or forest-flute.

Fingerings
In addition to the traditional "Baroque" (or "English") fingering, which was created in Haslemere in 1919 by Arnold Dolmetsch, soprano recorders have been made that make use of "German" fingering, which was introduced by Peter Harlan around 1926. In German fingering the note f2 is playable with a simpler fingering than the Baroque technique's forked (or cross-) fingering. However, German fingering has been described as a "step backwards ... made on the false assumption that the instrument would be easier for schoolchildren". The disadvantage is that other, unavoidable cross-fingerings become more difficult.

Material
Recorders with a plastic head joint or made completely of plastic are widely used. Soprano recorders are made from various woods such as maple, pear, boxwood, rosewood, olive, African blackwood, "rosewood", or ebony.

References

Sources

Further reading
 Baines, Anthony C. 1967. Woodwind Instruments and Their History, 3rd edition, with a foreword by Sir Adrian Boult. London: Faber and Faber. Reprinted with corrections, 1977. This edition reissued, Mineola, New York: Dover Publications, 1991, and reprinted again in 2012. .
  
 Praetorius, Michael. 1619a. Syntagmatis Musici Michaelis Praetorii C. Tomus Secundus De Organographia. Wolfenbüttel: Elias Holwein, in Verlegung des Autoris.
 Praetorius, Michael. 1619b. Syntagmatis Musici Michaelis Praetorii C. Tomus Tertius. Wolfenbüttel: Elias Holwein.
 Sachs, Curt. 1913. Real-Lexikon der Musikinstrumente, zugleich ein Polyglossar für das gesamte Instrumentengebiet. Berlin: Julius Bard.

Baroque instruments
Early musical instruments
Internal fipple flutes
Recorders (musical instruments)